Dirk Jacobus "Dick" Stellingwerf (born 23 May 1953 in Utrecht) is a Dutch politician of the Reformatory Political Federation (RPF) and his successor the ChristianUnion (ChristenUnie). He was an MP from 1994 to 2002. From 2008 to 2013 he was mayor of Lemsterland, and from 2015 to 2017 acting mayor of Schiermonnikoog.

Stellingwerf was a municipal councillor as well as an alderman of Ede, and a member of the provincial parliament of Gelderland.

He is a member of the Netherlands Reformed Churches.

References 
  Parlement.com biography

1953 births
Living people
Aldermen in Gelderland
People from Ede, Netherlands
Christian Union (Netherlands) politicians
21st-century Dutch politicians
Mayors of Schiermonnikoog
Mayors in Friesland
Members of the House of Representatives (Netherlands)
Members of the Provincial Council of Gelderland
Municipal councillors in Gelderland
Netherlands Reformed Churches Christians from the Netherlands
People from Lemsterland
Politicians from Utrecht (city)
Reformatory Political Federation politicians